Einheitslokomotive ("standard locomotive") may refer to:

 Einheitsdampflokomotive, steam locomotives built under the direction of the Deutsche Reichsbahn-Gesellschaft from 1925
 Einheits-Elektrolokomotive, built for the Deutsche Bundesbahn after World War 2

See also
 History of rail transport in Germany